RNA-binding protein 26 is a protein that in humans is encoded by the RBM26 gene.

References

Further reading